Batad may refer to:

 Ifugao language
 Batad, Iloilo, Philippines
 The Batad Rice Terraces, one of the clusters of the Rice Terraces of the Philippine Cordilleras, a UNESCO World Heritage Site